is a Japanese rock band from Osaka. The band name Ulfuls is derived from a misreading of the word "soulful," found on the cover of one of the band members' favorite records. They were signed by Toshiba-EMI in 1992, but after 15 years they transferred to Warner Music Group.

History
Having debuted in 1992 with the single, "Yabure Kabure," they initially had very limited success. However, by 1996, the group experienced huge superstar fame, fueled by the singles "Guts Da Ze!!," and "Boogie Woogie '96". Their lead singer is Tortoise Matsumoto. The other members are Ulful Keisuke on guitar, John B. Chopper on bass and Sankon Jr. on drums. In 1996 they wrote the song "Sky" for the film Gamera 2: Attack of Legion. In 1999 John B. Chopper left the group, which nevertheless continued on as a three-member group. However, in 2002 Chopper returned to the group again, making it a four-member group once more.
The band's song "Ryoho for you" (両方 For You) was chosen as the official theme song for the 2007 Summer Koshien baseball tournament . Their song "Baka Survivor" was used as the 2nd opening theme for the anime Bobobo-bo Bo-bobo (ボボボーボ・ボーボボ).

After being active for 21 years, Ulfuls announced they would stop touring following their "Yassa!" (ヤッサ！) outdoor concert event, held in Osaka on August 29 and 30, 2009. Although, in early 2014, the group announced that they were ending its hiatus, and released its 32nd single, "Doudemo yo Sugi" (どうでもよすぎ), in February 2014. The single was their first release in several years. Ulfuls went on to release its twelfth studio album, "One Mind", that May, to impressive sales. After the release of their 13th album, "Born To Be Wai Wai," the band released their 14th, "人生 (Life)" to commemorate their 25th anniversary.

On 19 February 2018, it was announced on their official website that Ulful Keisuke would be taking a break from the band to work on his solo career. It was also mentioned that Ulfuls would continue to produce music as a three-man band.

Members
: Lead vocals; real name  (1988-present)
: Guitar; real name  (1988-2018)
: Bass; real name  (1988-1999, 2002-present)
: Drums; real name  (1988-present)

Discography

Singles

Special release singles

Albums

Virtual albums
 iTunes Originals - Ulfuls (Japanese exclusive)

VHS/DVD
Ulful V (Ulfuls DVD)
Ulful V Jū
Live In Japan
Ai Yue Ni Aa, Au Yue Ni Bakuhatsu!!
Ulfuls Ga Yatte Kureru Yassa! Yassa! Yassa!
Ashita Ga Aru Sa "Kaze Fukeba Shoshikantetsu" (DVD Single)
Ulfuls Ga Yatte Kureru Yassa! Yassa! Yassassa!
Tsū Tsū Ura Ura
Eenen Osakan Graffiti
Ulfuls at Budōkan

External links
ulfuls - Warner Music Japan
ULFULS.COM -  ulfuls Official Website
TAISUKE HOME PAGE - Ulfuls's Taisuke's Official Website
ulfuls - Myspace

References

Japanese rock music groups
Musical groups from Osaka